Laura Miano (born 8 March 1959, in Genoa) is a former Italian sprinter, that won one medal at the International athletics competitions and one with the national relay team .

Biography
Laura Miano has 21 caps in national team from 1977 to 1984.

National titles
Laura Miano has won 4 times the individual national championship.
2 wins in the 100 metres (1978, 1979)
2 wins in the 60 metres indoor (1980, 1984)

See also
 Italy national relay team

References

External links
 

1959 births
Italian female sprinters
Sportspeople from Genoa
Living people
Mediterranean Games silver medalists for Italy
Mediterranean Games bronze medalists for Italy
Athletes (track and field) at the 1979 Mediterranean Games
Mediterranean Games medalists in athletics
20th-century Italian women
21st-century Italian people